Live from Soundscape is a 1994 released album of a live 1981 performance by the New York based No Wave music group Material.

The album is something of an oddity in the discography of Material. While most of their albums explored a fusion of funk, no-wave, world music and jazz, Live from Soundscape is an example of non-idiomatic free improvisation. The band, led by bassist Bill Laswell, recorded live onstage with no pre-planned melodies, rhythms or themes.

Track listing
"Chaos Never Died" (Material) – 61:58

Personnel
Bill Laswell – electric bass
Michael Beinhorn – electronics
Fred Frith – guitar
Charles Noyes – percussion
David Moss – percussion
Mark Miller – percussion

Production
Recorded live at Soundscape, New York, on October 16, 1981.
Produced by Verna Gillis.

Release history
1994 – DIW Japan, 389 (CD)

Material (band) albums
1994 live albums
DIW Records live albums